Like every other large city, Moscow has many hotels rated from 2 to 5 stars. Several large hotel chains are present in Moscow, including Sheraton, Marriott and Radisson.

In 2010 there were 267 hotels in Moscow. The city plans to increase the number of hotels to 535 in 2020.

In order to deal with high prices, numerous other options are available on the market, including hostels and short-term apartment rental.

Gallery

List of 5-star hotels in Moscow 
 Four Seasons Hotel Moscow
 Golden Ring Hotel
 Hilton Moscow Leningradskaya Hotel
 Hotel Metropol
 Lotte Hotel Moscow
 Radisson Royal Hotel Moscow (Hotel Ukraina)
 Ritz-Carlton Hotel Moscow
 Savoy Hotel Moscow
 Swissôtel Krasnye Holmy Moscow
 Ararat Park Hyatt Moscow

Other notable hotels

 Cosmos Hotel
 Izmailovo Hotel

References